The Badger Conference is a high school athletic conference comprising 16 high schools in south-central Wisconsin.  Established in 1951, the Badger Conference is a member of the WIAA.

Member schools

Badger West Conference

Northwest Division

 Baraboo
 Portage
 Reedsburg
 Sauk Prairie

Southwest Division

 Mt. Horeb (co-op with Barneveld in football and wrestling)
 Edgewood
 Monroe
 Oregon

Badger East Conference

Northeast Division
 Beaver Dam
 DeForest
 Watertown
 Waunakee

Southeast Division

 Fort Atkinson
 Milton
 Monona Grove
 Stoughton

Badger Football-Only Large Conference

 Beaver Dam
 Milton
 Oregon
 Sun Prairie East High School
 Sun Prairie West High School
 Watertown
 Waunakee

Badger Football-Only Small Conference

 DeForest
 Fort Atkinson
 Monona Grove
 Mt. Horeb (co-op with Barneveld in football and wrestling)
 Portage
 Sauk Prairie
 Stoughton

Charter members
 Edgerton
 Evansville
 Fort Atkinson
 Jefferson
 Lake Mills
 Middleton
 Milton Union
 Monroe
 Stoughton
 Wisconsin High

Previous members
 Edgerton
 Evansville
 Jefferson
 Lake Mills
 Middleton
 Wisconsin High
 Sun Prairie
 McFarland
 Verona

See also
List of high school athletic conferences in Wisconsin

References

External links
Badger Conference
Badger Conference realignment information

Sports organizations established in 1951
Wisconsin high school sports conferences
1951 establishments in Wisconsin